Farm to Market Roads in Texas are owned and maintained by the Texas Department of Transportation (TxDOT).

FM 3500

Farm to Market Road 3500 (FM 3500) was located in El Paso County. No highway currently uses the FM 3500 designation.

FM 3500 was designated on April 26, 1989, from FM 1905 in Anthony south and east to I-10. FM 3500 was cancelled on October 29, 1998, and most of the eastern segment of the route was subsumed by Spur 6.

FM 3501

Farm to Market Road 3501 (FM 3501) is located in Leon County.

FM 3501 was designated on February 27, 1989, on the current route.

FM 3502

Farm to Market Road 3502 (FM 3502) was located in Bexar County. It ran from FM 1516 northeast to FM 78 in Converse.

FM 3502 was designated on December 30, 1988, from FM 78 northeast of Converse southwest to FM 1516 as a replacement of a spur of FM 1976. On June 30, 1995, the entire route was transferred to Urban Road 3502 (UR 3502). The designation reverted to FM 3502 with the elimination of the Urban Road system on November 15, 2018. FM 3502 was deleted on April 30, 2020, and jurisdiction was given to the city of Converse.

FM 3503

Farm to Market Road 3503 (FM 3503) is located in Ector and Midland counties. It runs from I-20 at Grandview Avenue in Odessa south and east to FM 1788 south of Midland.

FM 3503 was designated on April 26, 1989, on its current route.

Junction list

FM 3504

Farm to Market Road 3504 (FM 3504) was located in Denton County, entirely within the city of Lewisville.

FM 3504 began at an intersection with Business SH 121-H, the former routing of SH 121 through Lewisville, just north of the Interstate 35E (I-35E) freeway. The route traveled north along Mill Street (a four-lane undivided highway for all but a small stretch near the southern terminus), past a variety of older businesses and a school, before state maintenance ended just north of Main Street at an intersection with Church Street. Mill Street continued north under local jurisdiction toward Lewisville Lake.

FM 3504 was originally a spur route of FM 1171 designated in 1971; the mileage was transferred to the current route number on May 30, 1990. FM 1171 currently ends at I-35E, but historically continued along Main and Church Streets (a pair of one-way streets) through eastern Lewisville to SH 121 (now the business route). That section of FM 1171 was removed from the state highway system in 2003, leaving FM 3504 with a northern terminus that no longer connected to the state highway system.

On June 27, 1995, the designation of the route was internally changed to Urban Road 3504 (UR 3504). On June 28, 2012, the route was removed from the state highway system.

FM 3505

Farm to Market Road 3505 (FM 3505) is located in Hopkins County. Its southern terminus is at FM 71 north of Sulphur Springs.

FM 3505 was designated on August 29, 1989, along its current route.

FM 3506

Farm to Market Road 3506 (FM 3506) is located in Henderson County. It runs about  near the western shore of Lake Palestine, from SH 155 in Coffee City west, then northwest, to FM 315.

FM 3506 was designated on August 29, 1989, along the current route, as a replacement for two county roads. However, construction did not begin until 2004. The roadway was opened to traffic in May 2006.

FM 3507

Farm to Market Road 3507 (FM 3507) was located in Brazoria County. No highway currently uses the FM 3507 designation.

FM 3507 was designated on August 29, 1989, from SH 288 northwest of Angleton south and west  to FM 521. By district request, FM 3507 was cancelled on September 29, 1992, and its mileage was transferred to FM 523.

FM 3508

Farm to Market Road 3508 (FM 3508) is located in Blanco County. The highway runs from RM 962 near Cypress Mill eastward to an intersection with a county road.

FM 3508 was designated in 1989 along the current route.

FM 3509

Farm to Market Road 3509 (FM 3509) is located in Burnet County. It runs from County Road 116 near Inks Lake State Park east to SH 29.

FM 3509 was designated on August 29, 1989, on the current route.

FM 3510

Farm to Market Road 3510 (FM 3510) is located in Atascosa County.

FM 3510 was designated on August 29, 1989, on the current route.

FM 3511

Farm to Market Road 3511 (FM 3511) was a designation proposed for a highway in Bee County. No highway currently uses the FM 3511 designation.

FM 3511 was designated on August 29, 1989, from FM 1349 southwest of Beeville, southeastward approximately  via Central Avenue, to FM 888. FM 3511 was cancelled on November 29, 1990, by request of the county.

FM 3512

Farm to Market Road 3512 (FM 3512) is located in San Patricio County. It begins at SH 35 west of Aransas Pass.

FM 3512 was designated on August 29, 1989, on the current route.

FM 3513

Farm to Market Road 3513 (FM 3513) is located in Hardin County, mostly within the city of Lumberton.

FM 3514

Farm to Market Road 3514 (FM 3514) is located in Jefferson County. It is designated the Joshua W. Allen, Sr. Highway. FM 3514's western terminus is at Spur 93 (West Port Arthur Road). It runs to the east, passing by the Texas Department of Criminal Justice's Mark W. Stiles Unit, Larry Gist State Jail, and LeBlanc Unit. The route's eastern terminus is at US 69.

FM 3514 was designated on August 29, 1989, along its current route. On June 30, 1995, the entire route was transferred to Urban Road 3514 (UR 3514). The designation reverted to FM 3514 with the elimination of the Urban Road system on November 15, 2018.

FM 3515

FM 3516

FM 3517

Farm to Market Road 3517 (FM 3517) is located in Hall County.

FM 3517 was designated on August 29, 1989, along its current route.

FM 3518

Farm to Market Road 3518 (FM 3518) was located in Brazos County. There is no highway currently using the FM 3518 designation.

FM 3518 was designated on December 14, 1989, from FM 60 in Bryan/College Station north to FM 1179. By district request, FM 3518 was cancelled on February 1, 1991, and transferred to FM 2154. However, the minute order designating was repealed, as neither the city of Bryan nor College Station accepted the provisions of the minute order designating FM 3518, meaning the extension of FM 2154 was cancelled.

FM 3519

Farm to Market Road 3519 (FM 3518) is located in Garza County.

FM 3519 was designated on January 30, 1990, along its current route.

FM 3520

Farm to Market Road 3520 (FM 3520) is located in Sabine County.

FM 3520 was designated on February 27, 1990, along its current route.

FM 3521

Farm to Market Road 3521 (FM 3521) is located in Angelina County. It connects FM 2021 north of Lufkin, westward approximately 0.3 mile to US 59 north of US 59 and US 69 merger.

FM 3521 was designated on March 1, 1990, along its current route, replacing a portion of FM 2021 by district request.

FM 3522

Farm to Market Road 3522 (FM 3522) is located in Jones and Shackelford counties. It runs from FM 1082 north of Abilene, eastward and southward to the intersection of SH 351 and FM 604, a distance of approximately 6.1 miles. Passing TDCJ Prisons French Roberts Unit and John Middleton Unit.

FM 3522 was designated on April 25, 1990, from FM 1082 eastward  to a county road. The road was extended east and south over two county roads to SH 351 & FM 604 on February 27, 1997.

FM 3523

Farm to Market Road 3523 (FM 3523) is located in Lubbock County.

FM 3523 begins at an intersection with FM 835/FM 1729 east of Lubbock. The highway runs east, passing just north of Ransom Canyon and Buffalo Springs Lake. FM 3523 leaves the Ransom Canyon area and ends at an intersection with FM 400 southeast of Roosevelt.

FM 3523 was designated on June 21, 1990, along its current route when a section of County Road 6900 was upgraded.

FM 3524

Farm to Market Road 3524 (FM 3524) is located in Aubrey in Denton County. Beginning at FM 428 (Main Street), it runs northeastward approximately  along North Sherman Drive to US 377.

FM 3524 was designated on May 23, 1990, along its current route. Its mileage was transferred from FM Spur 428.

FM 3525

Farm to Market Road 3525 (FM 3525) is located in Mitchell County. It passes the Texas Department of Criminal Justice's Daniel Webster Wallace Unit and Dick Ware Transfer Facility, and Mitchell County Hospital.

FM 3525 was designated on April 28, 1994, from West 10th Street to I-20. It was extended northeast to SH 208 on December 17, 2009.

FM 3526

Farm to Market Road 3526 (FM 3526) was located in Frio County.

FM 3526 was designated on July 26, 1990, along County Road 156 at Hondo Creek for a bridge replacement project. The route was cancelled when the project was complete, and is now County Road 1301.

FM 3527

Farm to Market Road 3527 (FM 3527) is located in Texarkana. The highway is known locally as Leopard Drive.

FM 3527 begins at an intersection with FM 989 just outside of the Texarkana city limits. The highway briefly travels in an east direction before turning north at Stipp Road. The highway enters into Texarkana just south of a junction with Loop 151. FM 3527 travels through a rural area of the city's southwest side before ending at an intersection with SH 93.

FM 3527 was designated on March 26, 1991, along the current route. The entire highway was internally re-designated as Urban Road 3527 (UR 3527) on June 27, 1995. The designation reverted to FM 3527 with the elimination of the Urban Road system on November 15, 2018.

FM 3529

Farm to Market Road 3529 (FM 3529) is located in McLennan County. It runs from SH 164, in Mart as North Front Street, northwestward and southwestward to TJJD McLennan County State Juvenile Correctional Facility, a distance of approx. 0.5 mile.

FM 3529 was designated on August 26, 1998, on the current route.

FM 3530

Farm to Market Road 3530 (FM 3530) is located in Wood County. It runs from FM 852 in Winnsboro, southwestward approximately 0.7 mile passing Winnsboro Municipal Airport to TDCJ Clyde M Johnston prison facility.

FM 3530 was designated on August 25, 1994, on the current route.

FM 3531

Farm to Market Road 3531 (FM 3531) is a proposed route that is designated in Pecos County, running approximately  along CR 130 (Old Alpine Highway), from Spur 194 southwestward to FM 2037.

FM 3531 was designated on October 28, 1999, along the current route. , the roadway has not been upgraded and is not under TxDOT maintenance.

FM 3532

Farm to Market Road 3532 (FM 3532) is a designated truck bypass route on the east side of Kermit, running approximately  along CR 313, from SH 115 southeastward to SH 302.

FM 3532 was designated on October 28, 1999, along the current route. The proposed deletion of the route was deferred on October 30, 2003. , it is unsigned and not under TxDOT maintenance.

FM 3533

Farm to Market Road 3533  (FM 3533) is located in McCulloch County. It runs from FM 714 northeastward to US 190, a distance of approximately 1.2 miles.

East side of Brady, TX.

FM 3533 was designated on July 27, 2000, on its current route, along a county road which was briefly part of FM 714.

FM 3534

Farm to Market Road 3534 (FM 3534) was located in Shelby County.

FM 3534 was designated from US 96 in Center northwest  along Old Timpson Road to a point west of Center. On July 29, 2004, FM 3534 was cancelled and returned to the city of Center.

FM 3535

Farm to Market Road 3535 (FM 3535) was located in Camp County. No highway currently uses the FM 3535 designation.

On December 17, 2015, FM 3535 was redesignated Loop 255.

FM 3536

FM 3537

Farm to Market Road 3537 (FM 3537) is located in Collin County, entirely within the city of Frisco. It is a redesignated remnant of what used to be FM 720. FM 3537 is a suburban road that begins at SH 289 (Preston Road) in the center of Frisco. It travels eastward to its terminus at FM 2478 (Custer Road) on the border between Frisco and McKinney. The road is designated as Main Street.

FM 3537 was originally part of FM 720, which was designated in Collin County on October 17, 1947. FM 720 replaced an old alignment of SH 24 between SH 289 and US 75, connecting Frisco and McKinney. On September 9, 1955, FM 720 was extended westward through downtown Frisco and into Denton County, to the new alignment of SH 24 (which would become US 380 in 1977), replacing FM 388 and portions of FM 423. FM 720 was truncated on August 30, 2001, when the portion from FM 2478 to US 75 was removed from the state highway system. FM 720 was truncated further on January 31, 2002, when the portion from FM 423 to SH 289 was removed from the state highway system, and the segment of FM 720 in east Frisco between SH 289 and FM 2478 was retained on the system and redesignated as FM 3537.

FM 3538

Farm to Market Road 3538 (FM 3538) is located in Austin County. It runs from US 90 southward to FM 3013.

FM 3538 was designated on April 24, 2003, on its current route.

FM 3539

Farm to Market Road 3539 (FM 3539) was a proposed designation for the roadway connecting SH 20 to the U.S.–Mexico border at the former Fabens–Caseta International Bridge in El Paso County. Under the proposal, FM 1109 was to have been cancelled upon the opening of FM 3539. On May 27, 2010, FM 1109 was cancelled. FM 3380 was extended southwest over the road on February 23, 2012, as that route's proposed routing was modified pending the construction of the Tornillo–Guadalupe International Bridge.

TxDOT does not have a designation file for FM 3539.

FM 3540

FM 3540 was designated on July 28, 2005, along the proposed route.

FM 3541

Farm to Market Road 3541 (FM 3541) was located in Culberson County in West Texas. The southern terminus of FM 3541 was at Rustler Springs Road in unincorporated Culberson County. The route traveled north for approximately 6.2 miles before ending at RM 652.

The current FM 3541 was added to the state highway system as a part of FM 2185 in 1968. On April 30, 1991, the central portion of FM 2185 was returned to county maintenance, leaving a gap in FM 2185. On January 26, 2006, this northern stretch of FM 2185 was renumbered FM 3541, as another section of FM 2185 was also returned to county maintenance. On August 27, 2020, FM 3541 was cancelled and became part of FM 2185 because the deleted portions of FM 2185 were restored.

FM 3549

Farm to Market Road 3549 (FM 3549) is located in Rockwall County. It runs from FM 552 northeast of Rockwall south to I-30.

FM 3549 was designated on September 24, 2009, on the current route as a replacement of a section of FM 549.

FM 3550

Farm to Market Road 3550 (FM 3550) is located in Cameron County. It runs from 0.4 mile north of Dockberry Road to FM 3068.

FM 3550 was designated on April 29, 2010, on the current route as a replacement of a section of FM 1419.

FM 3551

Farm to Market Road 3551 (FM 3551) is located in Cameron County. It runs from a point 0.7 mile south of SH 4 to SH 4.

FM 3551 was designated on April 29, 2010, on the current route as a replacement of a section of FM 1419.

FM 4000

Farm to Market Road 4000 (FM 4000) is a  highway that is located near Mount Pleasant.

FM 4000 begins at a junction with US 271 in southern Mount Pleasant. The highway runs in a northeast direction and turns east near Bus. US 271 (Jefferson Avenue). FM 4000 intersects Bus. US 271 near a retail center in the southern part of the city and passes by a subdivision before leaving the city. The highway travels in a mostly eastern direction and ends at an intersection with FM 1735. The section of FM 4000 between US 271 and Jefferson Avenue is locally known as Marvin Priefert Highway, while the section between Jefferson Avenue and the Mount Pleasant city limits is known as Jerry Boatner Parkway.

FM 4000 was designated on March 28, 2013, along the current route.

Junction list

FM 7550

Farm to Market Road 7550 (FM 7550) was located in Starr County. No highway currently uses the FM 7550 designation.

FM 7550 was cancelled six months later and replaced with FM 755 when it was rerouted; the old route of FM 755 was returned to the city and county.

References

+35
Farm to market roads 3500
Farm to Market Roads 3500